Ronald Valentine Trubuhovich  (born 6 March 1929) is a medical doctor and a major pioneer of critical care medicine in New Zealand.

Background
Trubuhovich, who is of Dalmatian parentage, was born in New Plymouth, but after age 7 spent his childhood in Auckland. He was educated at St Peter's College of which he was dux in 1946 and 1947.

Medicine
He gained the degrees of Bachelor of Dental Surgery (Otago) (1953, with 2 distinctions in 1951), Bachelor of Medical Science (Otago) (1960) and Bachelor of Medicine and Bachelor of Surgery (with distinction in Physiology, 1956) (Otago) (1961). He was awarded the J. Malcolm Prize in Physiology in 1956 and the Geigy Essay Prize in Psychiatry in 1962. He gained a Nuffield Dominion Scholarship to Oxford University and Oxford's Radcliffe Infirmary in 1964 and completed a research MSc there. In 2019 he gained his doctorate, MD, from the University of Auckland with his thesis 'Resuscitation and the Origins of
Intensive Care/Critical Care Medicine'. His specialist qualifications include FFARCS, FANZCA and College of Intensive Care Medicine, Australia and New Zealand FCICMANZ.

Critical care
He was Deputy Medical Officer-in-Charge, 1968-1983, then headed the intensive or critical care services in Auckland at Auckland Hospital being Chairman of the Department of Critical Care Medicine, Auckland Hospital until obligatory formal retirement in 1994, although he continued working there for 4 more years. He was President of the Australian and New Zealand Intensive Care Society (1981-1982), inaugural Vice-Dean of the Faculty of Intensive Care, Australian & New Zealand College of Anaesthetists (1993–96), President of the Auckland Medical History Society (2008-9). He is a published author on medical history (resuscitation and intensive care medicine: with intensivist colleague Dr James A Judson he produced the 150 paged 'Intensive Care in New Zealand, A History of the New Zealand Region of ANZICS', 2001, for the 40th anniversary of their unit; also his self-published booklet, 2015, on the ill-health and death of Governor William Hobson).

Honours and awards
In the 1997 Queen's Birthday Honours, Trubuhovich was appointed an Officer of the New Zealand Order of Merit, for services to medicine. In 2012, he was honoured by being named an "old boy of distinction" of his old school, St Peter's College.

References

1929 births
Living people
People from Auckland
New Zealand people of Croatian descent
People educated at St Peter's College, Auckland
University of Otago alumni
New Zealand anaesthetists
Officers of the New Zealand Order of Merit